The 1996–97 NBA season was the Bullets' 36th season in the National Basketball Association. During the off-season, the Bullets acquired Rod Strickland and former Bullets forward Harvey Grant from the Portland Trail Blazers, and signed free agents Tracy Murray, and Jaren Jackson. Despite a stellar season last year, Juwan Howard signed a 7-year $100 million contract with the Miami Heat. However, the deal was voided claiming that Miami exceeded their salary cap; the Bullets quickly re-signed Howard, but would lose their first round draft pick next year.

After 46 games into the season, the Bullets fired head coach Jim Lynam, then after playing one game under assistant Bob Staak, and holding a 22–25 record at the All-Star break, they hired former Bullets assistant Bernie Bickerstaff as their new coach. Under Bickerstaff, the Bullets finished the season winning 16 of their final 21 games. On the final day of the regular season on April 20, 1997, the Bullets defeated the Cleveland Cavaliers, 85–81 at the Gund Arena to capture the #8 seed in the Eastern Conference. They finished fourth in the Atlantic Division with a 44–38 record, ending an eight-year playoff drought, and making the playoffs for the first time since 1988.

Chris Webber averaged 20.1 points, 10.3 rebounds, 4.6 assists, 1.7 steals and 1.9 blocks per game, and was selected for the 1997 NBA All-Star Game, which was his first All-Star appearance. In addition, Howard averaged 19.1 points and 8.0 rebounds per game, while Strickland provided the team with 17.2 points, 8.9 assists and 1.7 steals per game. Calbert Cheaney and last season's Most Improved Player, Gheorghe Mureșan both contributed 10.6 points per game each, while Mureșan provided with 6.6 rebounds and 1.3 blocks per game, and Murray contributed 10.0 points per game off the bench.

In the Eastern Conference First Round of the playoffs, the Bullets were swept by Michael Jordan, Scottie Pippen and the defending champion Chicago Bulls in three straight games, losing Game 3 at home by one point, 96–95 after taking a 14–2 lead early in the first quarter. This would be their final playoff appearance until 2005. The Bulls would go on to defeat the Utah Jazz in six games in the NBA Finals, winning their fifth championship in seven years. Following the season, Jackson signed as a free agent with the San Antonio Spurs.

For Washington, Game 3 of that series at US Airways Arena was officially their final game as the "Bullets". In 1995, Bullets owner Abe Pollin decided to change the team's name due to gun violence in Washington D.C., and after the assassination of his friend, Israel Prime Minister Yitzhak Rabin. On May 15, 1997, the team officially changed its name to the "Wizards", and became known as the "Washington Wizards" the following season. However, the Bullets were held up by a copyright lawsuit filed by the Harlem Wizards, a traveling comedy basketball team with the same name. Still, the Bullets won the trademark infringement case as a court ruling allowed them to change their name to the "Wizards".

Draft picks

Roster

Regular season

Season standings

z – clinched division title
y – clinched division title
x – clinched playoff spot

Record vs. opponents

Game log

Regular season

|- align="center" bgcolor="#ccffcc"
| 1
| November 1, 1996
| @ Orlando
| W 96–92
|
|
|
| Orlando Arena
| 1–0
|- align="center" bgcolor="#ffcccc"
| 2
| November 2, 1996
| Cleveland
| L 96–98 (OT)
|
|
|
| US Airways Arena
| 1–1
|- align="center" bgcolor="#ccffcc"
| 3
| November 6, 1996
| San Antonio
| W 96–86
|
|
|
| US Airways Arena
| 2–1
|- align="center" bgcolor="#ffcccc"
| 4
| November 8, 1996
| Charlotte
| L 87–102
|
|
|
| US Airways Arena
| 2–2
|- align="center" bgcolor="#ffcccc"
| 5
| November 9, 1996
| @ Indiana
| L 100–103 (OT)
|
|
|
| Market Square Arena
| 2–3
|- align="center" bgcolor="#ffcccc"
| 6
| November 12, 1996
| Detroit
| L 79–92
|
|
|
| US Airways Arena
| 2–4
|- align="center" bgcolor="#ccffcc"
| 7
| November 13, 1996
| @ New Jersey
| W 106–91
|
|
|
| Continental Airlines Arena
| 3–4
|- align="center" bgcolor="#ffcccc"
| 8
| November 15, 1996
| @ Detroit
| L 84–95
|
|
|
| The Palace of Auburn Hills
| 3–5
|- align="center" bgcolor="#ccffcc"
| 9
| November 16, 1996
| Boston
| W 106–92
|
|
|
| US Airways Arena
| 4–5
|- align="center" bgcolor="#ffcccc"
| 10
| November 20, 1996
| Seattle
| L 110–115 (2OT)
|
|
|
| US Airways Arena
| 4–6
|- align="center" bgcolor="#ccffcc"
| 11
| November 22, 1996
| Philadelphia
| W 88–76
|
|
|
| US Airways Arena
| 5–6
|- align="center" bgcolor="#ccffcc"
| 12
| November 23, 1996
| @ Milwaukee
| W 95–90
|
|
|
| Bradley Center
| 6–6
|- align="center" bgcolor="#ccffcc"
| 13
| November 25, 1996
| Minnesota
| W 105–98
|
|
|
| US Airways Arena
| 7–6
|- align="center" bgcolor="#ffcccc"
| 14
| November 29, 1996
| @ Atlanta
| L 81–110
|
|
|
| The Omni
| 7–7
|- align="center" bgcolor="#ffcccc"
| 15
| November 30, 1996
| Houston
| L 99–103
|
|
|
| US Airways Arena
| 7–8

|- align="center" bgcolor="#ffcccc"
| 16
| December 5, 1996
| @ Toronto
| L 80–82
|
|
|
| SkyDome
| 7–9
|- align="center" bgcolor="#ffcccc"
| 17
| December 7, 1996
| Milwaukee
| L 118–126
|
|
|
| US Airways Arena
| 7–10
|- align="center" bgcolor="#ffcccc"
| 18
| December 10, 1996
| @ New York
| L 73–85
|
|
|
| Madison Square Garden
| 7–11
|- align="center" bgcolor="#ccffcc"
| 19
| December 11, 1996
| Cleveland
| W 106–95
|
|
|
| US Airways Arena
| 8–11
|- align="center" bgcolor="#ccffcc"
| 20
| December 13, 1996
| Denver
| W 108–104
|
|
|
| US Airways Arena
| 9–11
|- align="center" bgcolor="#ccffcc"
| 21
| December 15, 1996
| @ Golden State
| W 110–102
|
|
|
| San Jose Arena
| 10–11
|- align="center" bgcolor="#ccffcc"
| 22
| December 16, 1996
| @ Sacramento
| W 97–89
|
|
|
| ARCO Arena
| 11–11
|- align="center" bgcolor="#ffcccc"
| 23
| December 18, 1996
| @ Phoenix
| L 107–114
|
|
|
| America West Arena
| 11–12
|- align="center" bgcolor="#ccffcc"
| 24
| December 19, 1996
| @ L.A. Clippers
| W 102–93
|
|
|
| Los Angeles Memorial Sports Arena
| 12–12
|- align="center" bgcolor="#ffcccc"
| 25
| December 22, 1996
| @ Vancouver
| L 87–91
|
|
|
| General Motors Place
| 12–13
|- align="center" bgcolor="#ccffcc"
| 26
| December 23, 1996
| @ Portland
| W 106–84
|
|
|
| Rose Garden Arena
| 13–13
|- align="center" bgcolor="#ccffcc"
| 27
| December 27, 1996
| Toronto
| W 100–82
|
|
|
| US Airways Arena
| 14–13
|- align="center" bgcolor="#ccffcc"
| 28
| December 28, 1996
| Atlanta
| W 97–86
|
|
|
| Baltimore Arena
| 15–13
|- align="center" bgcolor="#ffcccc"
| 29
| December 30, 1996
| Charlotte
| L 92–101
|
|
|
| US Airways Arena
| 15–14

|- align="center" bgcolor="#ffcccc"
| 30
| January 2, 1997
| New York
| L 80–92
|
|
|
| US Airways Arena
| 15–15
|- align="center" bgcolor="#ccffcc"
| 31
| January 4, 1997
| @ Charlotte
| W 104–93
|
|
|
| Charlotte Coliseum
| 16–15
|- align="center" bgcolor="#ccffcc"
| 32
| January 8, 1997
| Phoenix
| W 115–113 (OT)
|
|
|
| US Airways Arena
| 17–15
|- align="center" bgcolor="#ccffcc"
| 33
| January 10, 1997
| L.A. Clippers
| W 102–98
|
|
|
| US Airways Arena
| 18–15
|- align="center" bgcolor="#ccffcc"
| 34
| January 11, 1997
| @ Cleveland
| W 98–85
|
|
|
| Gund Arena
| 19–15
|- align="center" bgcolor="#ffcccc"
| 35
| January 13, 1997
| @ Miami
| L 95–93
|
|
|
| Miami Arena
| 19–16
|- align="center" bgcolor="#ffcccc"
| 36
| January 14, 1997
| @ Chicago
| L 107–108
|
|
|
| United Center
| 19–17
|- align="center" bgcolor="#ffcccc"
| 37
| January 17, 1997
| Miami
| L 92–103
|
|
|
| Baltimore Arena
| 19–18
|- align="center" bgcolor="#ccffcc"
| 38
| January 18, 1997
| @ Boston
| W 112–106
|
|
|
| FleetCenter
| 20–18
|- align="center" bgcolor="#ffcccc"
| 39
| January 20, 1997
| @ New York
| L 79–95
|
|
|
| Madison Square Garden
| 20–19
|- align="center" bgcolor="#ffcccc"
| 40
| January 21, 1997
| @ Orlando
| L 88–93
|
|
|
| Orlando Arena
| 20–20
|- align="center" bgcolor="#ffcccc"
| 41
| January 24, 1997
| @ Atlanta
| L 105–117 (OT)
|
|
|
| The Omni
| 20–21
|- align="center" bgcolor="#ccffcc"
| 42
| January 25, 1997
| Sacramento
| W 113–105
|
|
|
| US Airways Arena
| 21–21
|- align="center" bgcolor="#ccffcc"
| 43
| January 28, 1997
| Orlando
| W 102–82
|
|
|
| US Airways Arena
| 22–21
|- align="center" bgcolor="#ffcccc"
| 44
| January 31, 1997
| @ Seattle
| L 95–97
|
|
|
| KeyArena
| 22–22

|- align="center" bgcolor="#ffcccc"
| 45
| February 2, 1997
| @ L.A. Lakers
| L 99–129
|
|
|
| Great Western Forum
| 22–23
|- align="center" bgcolor="#ffcccc"
| 46
| February 3, 1997
| @ Utah
| L 89–111
|
|
|
| Delta Center
| 22–24
|- align="center" bgcolor="#ffcccc"
| 47
| February 5, 1997
| @ Denver
| L 104–106
|
|
|
| McNichols Sports Arena
| 22–25
|- align="center"
|colspan="9" bgcolor="#bbcaff"|All-Star Break
|- style="background:#cfc;"
|- bgcolor="#bbffbb"
|- align="center" bgcolor="#ffcccc"
| 48
| February 11, 1997
| New York
| L 92–97
|
|
|
| US Airways Arena
| 22–26
|- align="center" bgcolor="#ccffcc"
| 49
| February 14, 1997
| New Jersey
| W 125–107
|
|
|
| Baltimore Arena
| 23–26
|- align="center" bgcolor="#ffcccc"
| 50
| February 15, 1997
| @ New Jersey
| L 86–107
|
|
|
| Continental Airlines Arena
| 23–27
|- align="center" bgcolor="#ccffcc"
| 51
| February 17, 1997
| Milwaukee
| W 95–93
|
|
|
| US Airways Arena
| 24–27
|- align="center" bgcolor="#ffcccc"
| 52
| February 19, 1997
| @ Detroit
| L 85–100
|
|
|
| The Palace of Auburn Hills
| 24–28
|- align="center" bgcolor="#ffcccc"
| 53
| February 21, 1997
| Chicago
| L 99–103
|
|
|
| US Airways Arena
| 24–29
|- align="center" bgcolor="#ffcccc"
| 54
| February 23, 1997
| Detroit
| L 79–85
|
|
|
| US Airways Arena
| 24–30
|- align="center" bgcolor="#ccffcc"
| 55
| February 25, 1997
| Indiana
| W 108–87
|
|
|
| US Airways Arena
| 25–30
|- align="center" bgcolor="#ffcccc"
| 56
| February 27, 1997
| L.A. Lakers
| L 107–122
|
|
|
| US Airways Arena
| 25–31

|- align="center" bgcolor="#ccffcc"
| 57
| March 1, 1997
| Golden State
| W 118–108
|
|
|
| US Airways Arena
| 26–31
|- align="center" bgcolor="#ccffcc"
| 58
| March 4, 1997
| @ Philadelphia
| W 107–106
|
|
|
| CoreStates Center
| 27–31
|- align="center" bgcolor="#ccffcc"
| 59
| March 6, 1997
| @ Miami
| W 99–95
|
|
|
| Miami Arena
| 28–31
|- align="center" bgcolor="#ffcccc"
| 60
| March 7, 1997
| Miami
| L 105–108 (OT)
|
|
|
| US Airways Arena
| 28–32
|- align="center" bgcolor="#ffcccc"
| 61
| March 9, 1997
| Philadelphia
| L 93–99
|
|
|
| US Airways Arena
| 28–33
|- align="center" bgcolor="#ccffcc"
| 62
| March 12, 1997
| Vancouver
| W 104–82
|
|
|
| US Airways Arena
| 29–33
|- align="center" bgcolor="#ccffcc"
| 63
| March 14, 1997
| @ Milwaukee
| W 105–96
|
|
|
| Bradley Center
| 30–33
|- align="center" bgcolor="#ffcccc"
| 64
| March 15, 1997
| Utah
| L 93–100
|
|
|
| US Airways Arena
| 30–34
|- align="center" bgcolor="#ccffcc"
| 65
| March 17, 1997
| @ San Antonio
| W 109–85
|
|
|
| Alamodome
| 31–34
|- align="center" bgcolor="#ccffcc"
| 66
| March 18, 1997
| @ Dallas
| W 86–85
|
|
|
| Reunion Arena
| 32–34
|- align="center" bgcolor="#ffcccc"
| 67
| March 20, 1997
| @ Houston
| L 90–96
|
|
|
| The Summit
| 32–35
|- align="center" bgcolor="#ccffcc"
| 68
| March 22, 1997
| Portland
| W 108–104
|
|
|
| US Airways Arena
| 33–35
|- align="center" bgcolor="#ccffcc"
| 69
| March 26, 1997
| Boston
| W 105–92
|
|
|
| US Airways Arena
| 34–35
|- align="center" bgcolor="#ccffcc"
| 70
| March 28, 1997
| Toronto
| W 113–86
|
|
|
| US Airways Arena
| 35–35
|- align="center" bgcolor="#ccffcc"
| 71
| March 29, 1997
| Dallas
| W 94–87
|
|
|
| Baltimore Arena
| 36–35

|- align="center" bgcolor="#ccffcc"
| 72
| April 1, 1997
| @ Indiana
| W 104–100
|
|
|
| Market Square Arena
| 37–35
|- align="center" bgcolor="#ccffcc"
| 73
| April 3, 1997
| Chicago
| W 110–102
|
|
|
| US Airways Arena
| 38–35
|- align="center" bgcolor="#ffcccc"
| 74
| April 4, 1997
| @ Minnesota
| L 95–97
|
|
|
| Target Center
| 38–36
|- align="center" bgcolor="#ccffcc"
| 75
| April 6, 1997
| @ Boston
| W 120–114
|
|
|
| FleetCenter
| 39–36
|- align="center" bgcolor="#ffcccc"
| 76
| April 8, 1997
| @ Toronto
| L 94–100
|
|
|
| SkyDome
| 39–37
|- align="center" bgcolor="#ccffcc"
| 77
| April 11, 1997
| New Jersey
| W 109–90
|
|
|
| US Airways Arena
| 40–37
|- align="center" bgcolor="#ffcccc"
| 78
| April 12, 1997
| @ Charlotte
| L 97–99
|
|
|
| Charlotte Coliseum
| 40–38
|- align="center" bgcolor="#ccffcc"
| 79
| April 14, 1997
| @ Philadelphia
| W 131–110
|
|
|
| CoreStates Center
| 41–38
|- align="center" bgcolor="#ccffcc"
| 80
| April 16, 1997
| Indiana
| W 103–90
|
|
|
| US Airways Arena
| 42–38
|- align="center" bgcolor="#ccffcc"
| 81
| April 18, 1997
| Orlando
| W 104–93
|
|
|
| US Airways Arena
| 43–38
|- align="center" bgcolor="#ccffcc"
| 82
| April 20, 1997
| @ Cleveland
| W 85–81
|
|
|
| Gund Arena
| 44–38

Playoffs

|- align="center" bgcolor="#ffcccc"
| 1
| April 25, 1997
| @ Chicago
| L 86–98
| Juwan Howard (21)
| Rod Strickland (10)
| Rod Strickland (8)
| United Center24,122
| 0–1
|- align="center" bgcolor="#ffcccc"
| 2
| April 27, 1997
| @ Chicago
| L 104–109
| Calbert Cheaney (26)
| Chris Webber (12)
| Rod Strickland (8)
| United Center24,267
| 0–2
|- align="center" bgcolor="#ffcccc"
| 3
| April 30, 1997
| Chicago
| L 95–96
| Rod Strickland (24)
| Chris Webber (8)
| Rod Strickland (9)
| US Airways Arena18,756
| 0–3
|-

Player statistics

NOTE: Please write the players statistics in alphabetical order by last name.

Season

Playoffs

Awards and records

Transactions

References

See also
 1996–97 NBA season

Washington Wizards seasons
Wash
Wiz
Wiz